The Central Plains Region is an informal geographic region of the Canadian province of Manitoba located in the south central part of the Canadian province of Manitoba, directly west of Winnipeg.

Its major urban centre is the City of Portage la Prairie. Together with the Pembina Valley Region to the south, the Central Plains Region composes the broader cultural region of Central Manitoba. Geographically, the region is considered to be a part of southern Manitoba, and is serviced by the Southern Regional Health Authority.

As of the 2016 census, the region had a population of 50,300 (compared to 48,289 in the 2001 census).

Major communities

 Portage la Prairie (city)

Rural municipalities and communities

First Nations and reserves 

 Dakota Plains First Nation (Dakota Plains 6A, Dakota Tipi 1)
 Long Plain First Nation
 Sandy Bay 5

Points of interest

Parks and wetlands
Delta Marsh
Portage Spillway Provincial Park
Spruce Woods Provincial Park
 St. Ambroise Beach Provincial Park
 Stephenfield Provincial Park
Twin Lakes Beach
 Yellow Quill Provincial Park
Other
Manitoba Agricultural Museum
Prairie Wind Music Festival
Transport
Portage la Prairie/Southport Airport
3 Canadian Forces Flying Training School
KF Defence Programs
Portage la Prairie (North) Airport
Manitoba Highway 13
Manitoba Highway 100
Provincial Road 242
Provincial Road 248
Provincial Road 305

References

External links
 Central Manitoba Tourism
  Central Plains Regional Profile
Community Profile: Census Division No. 8, Manitoba; Statistics Canada
 Community Profile: Census Division No. 9, Manitoba; Statistics Canada 
 Community Profile: Census Division No. 10, Manitoba; Statistics Canada

 
Geographic regions of Manitoba